Following are the official winners of the national Turkish Chess Championships from 1962 to date.

Winners
{| class="sortable wikitable"
!  Year !! Winner !! Women's winner
|-
|1962 ||||
|-
|1963 ||||
|-
|1964 ||||
|-
|1965 ||||
|-
|1966 || ||
|-
|1967 || ||
|-
|1968 ||||
|-
|1969 ||||
|-
|1970 || ||
|-
|1971 || ||
|-
|1972 || ||
|-
|1973 ||||
|-
|1974 || ||
|-
|1975 || ||
|-
|1976 || ||
|-
|1977 || ||
|-
|1978 || ||
|-
|1979 || ||
|-
|1980 || ||
|-
|1981 || ||
|-
|1982 || ||
|-
|1983 || ||
|-
|1984||	||
|-
|1985 || ||
|-
|1986 ||||
|-
|1987 || ||
|-
|1988 || ||
|-
|1989 || ||
|-
|1990 || ||
|-
|1991 || ||
|-
|1992 || ||
|-
|1993 || ||
|-
|1994 || ||
|-
|1995 || ||
|-
|1996 || ||
|-
|1997 || ||
|-
|1998 || ||
|-
|1999 || ||
|-
|2000 || ||
|-
|2001 || ||
|-
|2002 || ||Betül Cemre Yıldız
|-
|2003 || ||Betül Cemre Yıldız
|-
|2004 || ||Betül Cemre Yıldız
|-
|2005 || ||Betül Cemre Yıldız
|-
|2006 || ||Betül Cemre Yıldız
|-
|2007 || ||
|-
|2008 || || Ekaterina Atalik
|-
|2009 ||  ||Betül Cemre Yıldız 
|-
|2010 ||  ||Betül Cemre Yıldız 
|-
|2011 || ||Betül Cemre Yıldız  
|-
|2012 || ||Kübra Öztürk
|-
|2013 || ||Betül Cemre Yıldız 
|-
|2014 || || Betül Cemre Yıldız
|-
|2015 || ||Betül Cemre Yıldız
|-
|2016 || Mert Erdoğdu|| Ekaterina Atalik
|-
|2017 ||  || Betül Cemre Yıldız
|-
|2018 ||Cemil Gülbaş|| Ekaterina Atalik
|-
|2019 || Vahap Şanal || Betül Cemre Yıldız Kadioglu
|-
|2020 || Vahap Şanal|| Ekaterina Atalik
|-
|2021
|Mert Yılmazyerli
|Ekaterina Atalık
|-
|2022
|Mustafa Yılmaz
|Ekaterina Atalık
|}

Notes

References
 Lists of winners from the Turkish Chess Federation (TCF)

Chess national championships
Women's chess national championships
Championship
Chess